Valerian Tevzadze (February 10, 1894 – December 13, 1985) was a Georgian military officer of the Democratic Republic of Georgia and later Poland, member of the Polish underground resistance movement during the occupation of Poland.

He was in the service of the Democratic Republic of Georgia (1918-1921). After the Soviet forces occupied the country, he left for Poland and joined the Polish army as a colonel. During the Nazi invasion of 1939, he took part in the northern defense of Warsaw. He was later awarded with the Silver Cross of the Virtuti Militari. During the German occupation of Poland he joined the Polish Home Army. As part of the Polish underground resistance movement he used the pseudonym Tomasz. After the Red Army took control of Poland, Valerian Tevzadze joined the Polish underground against the communists until his death in 1985.

He lived in Dzierżoniów, where he died. He was buried at the local cemetery. An inscription is carved on his grave: „Jako Gruzin chciałbym być pochowany w Gruzji, ale jestem szczęśliwy, że będę pochowany w ziemi szlachetnego i dzielnego Narodu Polskiego” (As a Georgian I would like to be buried in Georgia, but I am happy to be buried in the land of the noble and brave Polish nation.)

Memory 

On the facade of Tevzadze's house in Dzierżoniów, there is a memorial plaque.

Tevzadze is one of the people portrayed in the documentary film W rogatywce i tygrysiej skórze, directed by Jerzy Lubach.

In 2009, a monument dedicated to Tevzadze was unveiled in front of the headquarters of the Spółdzielnia Mieszkaniowa (Housing Cooperative) in Dzierżoniów in the presence of the Georgian ambassador to Poland Konstantine Kavtaradze.

In 2019, Polish Prime Minister Mateusz Morawiecki visited the tomb of Valerian Tevzadze at the Dzierżoniów cemetery.

The annual chess tournament named Tewzadze Open is organized in Dzierżoniów, to commemorate Tevzadze.

References

External links 
 Georgian Officers Fighting for Poland
 Dictionary of Georgian National Biography

Sources 

 Marian Porwit, "Obrona Warszawy 1939 r.", Czytelnik, Warszawa 1979, 
 Wojciech Borzobohaty, "Jodła", PAX, Warszawa 1984, 
 Jarosław Kresa, "Dobry człowiek, a jak krzemień twardy", "Twoja Spółdzielnia", Dzierżoniów, kwiecień 2008
  Pro Georgia 2008, Edited by David Kolbaia

Military personnel from Georgia (country)
People of World War II from Georgia (country)
Polish Army officers
Recipients of the Silver Cross of the Virtuti Militari
1894 births
1985 deaths